Christian Union is a political party in Lithuania. It held its constituent congress on 8 February 2020.

The constituent congress elected the initiator of the party, Rimantas Dagys, its chairman. Member of Seimas Egidijus Vareikis, Signatory of the Act of March 11 Jonas Šimėnas, and several former members of the Seimas (including Petras Luomanas, Jonas Valatka, and Arvydas Akstinavičius) also became members of the party. Priest Robertas Grigas presided over a prayer in the congress. He said that he was asked to do so by cardinal Sigitas Tamkevičius.

Initially the party was meant to be named "Christian Union 'Harmony and Welfare'", but the constituent congress has decided to shorten the name to "Christian Union".

The program adopted by the constituent congress claims that the party's "political activity is grounded in principles of Christian democracy and Christian social policy".

References

External links 
 Page in Facebook

Political parties established in 2020
2020 establishments in Lithuania
Conservative parties in Lithuania
Christian democratic parties in Europe
Social conservative parties